Maple Leaf International School-Dalian is a part of the Maple Leaf Educational Systems located in Jinshitan National Resort in Jinzhou District, Dalian, China, providing the British Columbia (BC) high school program from grade ten to grade twelve.

Maple Leaf accepts both domestic students and international students. Students are registered as British Columbia students and write the same Grade 10, 11 and 12 BC examinations as resident students in BC and graduate with the same BC Ministry of Education transcripts and graduation (Dogwood) diploma as resident students in BC. The grade 10-12 courses, with the exception of Mandarin and Chinese social studies, are taught by B.C. certified teachers. Currently, 2014, over 2,800 students are enrolled in grades 10-12 at the Dalian campus.

Maple Leaf offers separate-gender campuses at the Dalian location and mixed-gender campuses in Tianjin, Wuhan, Chonging, Zhenjiang, Luoyang, Ordos, and Shanghai.

History

School History
Dalian Maple Leaf International School: Jinshitan High School was opened in 1995 with 14 students. Student enrolment rapidly increased and new school facilities were constructed to meet the growing demand.

In 2009, a new girls’ campus was opened in Jinshitan across the road from the existing high school, which is now the boys’ campus. The combined enrolment in Grades 10, 11 and 12 from both campuses exceeds 2,600. 

Maple Leaf's Jinshitan High School's program was first inspected and certified by the British Columbia Ministry of Education in the 1997–98 school year. It was the first offshore school educational program certified by the Province of British Columbia and the school served as the Province's pilot school for developing British Columbia's Offshore School Certification Program.

Today, approximately 125 B.C. certified teachers are teaching British Columbia's high school program in Grades 10 to 12 at the Jinshitan campuses.

History of Maple Leaf Educational System
In 1995, Sherman Jen, founder and Headmaster, opened Dalian Maple Leaf International School, with 14 high school students enrolled.

In 1998, Dalian Maple Leaf International School was inspected and certified as British Columbia's first Offshore School Program.

1999
The first graduating class from Dalian Maple Leaf International School receive their high school diplomas and head off for colleges and universities in Canada, USA, UK and Korea
2001
The first Maple Leaf Elementary School opens in the Dalian Development Zone, Kaifaqu
2003
Maple Leaf Educational Systems Main Office opens in downtown Dalian
The first middle school campus of opens - Maple Leaf Middle School - Daheishi (Black Mountain) Campus
2004
Maple Leaf Institute of Technology opens in downtown Dalian (in cooperation with BCIT)

First Maple Leaf Pre-School opens (in cooperation with Learning Vision: Singapore)
2005
MLES Celebrated the 10th anniversary of the establishment of MLIS - Dalian
2006
Newly renovated campus for the Maple Leaf Foreign Nationals School opens in Dalian

Expansion throughout Dalian of Maple Leaf Pre-Schools
2007
Maple Leaf English is established to provide high quality ESL instruction and materials through the MLES system of schools

Two new campuses open in Wuhan - Wuhan Maple Leaf Foreign Nationals School and Wuhan Maple Leaf International High School
2008
The third MLES BC high school program opens in Tianjin – the Tianjin (TEDA) Maple Leaf International School

Maple Leaf Elementary and Middle Schools open in Tianjin offering and enhanced Chinese program K – 9
2009
The fourth BC High School program opens in Chongqing –Maple Leaf International School – Chongqing Campus

A second campus is opened in Dalian allowing the creation of separate boys’ and girls’ campuses. Maple Leaf International School High School Campus in Jinshitan Holiday Resort with Boys’ and Girls’ Campuses.
2010
MLES Celebrates its 15-year Anniversary

Daheishi Middle School moves to new facilities at the Dalian campus in Jinshitan

MLES Headquarter relocation to Jinshitan leading to the establishment of the Maple Leaf Educational Park - Dalian

The Foreign Nationals School – Dalian moves to a new location in downtown Dalian

2011
The fifth BC High School program opens in leased facilities in Zhenjiang – Maple Leaf International High School – Zhenjiang. Construction begins on new campus to be opened in 2012

New Elementary and Middle School facilities open in Tianjin TEDA leading to the establishment of the Maple Leaf Educational Park – Tianjin TEDA

Groundbreaking ceremony for the MLES first school in Korea – Maple Leaf International Academy – takes place in Suncheon City
2012
MLES signs agreement with the Educational Authority in Inner Mongolia, Ordos to establish a new school – Maple Leaf International Elementary/Middle School – which was scheduled to open in September 2012.

MLES signs a partnership agreement with the Henan Provincial Government to operate a Maple Leaf International Elementary/Middle School in a newly constructed, government owned facility in Luoyang. Classes will begin in September 2012

2013
On September 2, 2013 Mr. Sherman Jen, Founder and CEO of Maple Leaf Educational Systems (MLES) and distinguished guests, parents and students celebrated the opening of the newest Maple Leaf international school in China. The Maple Leaf International School - Shanghai is the 7th Maple Leaf high school, approved to deliver the BC curriculum. This school expands the Maple Leaf Educational Systems presence throughout China, adding Shanghai to the locations of our existing schools in Dalian, Wuhan, Tianjin, Chongqing, Zhenjiang, Luoyang and Ordos.
 2016
On August 29, 2016 Dalian Maple Leaf opened a new school in KaiFaQu, Dalian. The school is bigger and includes more facilities than the old school in Xigang District.

Academics
Dalian Maple Leaf International School Senior high (grades 10–12) offers B.C. certified courses British Columbia, Canada programs, taught entirely in English by B.C. certified teachers. Students complete the same courses, meet the same learning outcomes, are assessed in the same manner by the same standards as all British Columbia students. High school students write the same provincial examinations and graduate with the same British Columbia high school "Dogwood" diploma as students residing in British Columbia, Canada.

In addition, Chinese students complete extra Chinese courses, such as Chinese History, Geography, Political Science music and Mandarin, and graduate with a Chinese high school diploma as well. These Maple Leaf programs meet all British Columbia curriculum and Offshore School Program standards, as well as the inspection requirements of China's Education Authorities. Chinese as a Second Language (CSL) is provided for foreign students.

In order to graduate with a British Columbia Dogwood Certificate, students must accumulate at least 80 credits for courses completed in grades 10, 11, and 12. Credits from required courses contribute 48 credits, at least 28 credits must come from elective courses (students choose their electives according to their educational pathway), and Graduation Transitions has 4 credits.

Student life
Maple Leaf Student Union is responsible for organizing Christmas Party, holding Sports Week, sanitary examination, promoting events and serving as a bridge between students and school's administration department.

Popular student activities/clubs include: Ball hockey, Basketball, Music bands, Running club, Fitness club, Volleyball, Ping pong, Football, Drama club, Speech club, English café, Leadership, Art club, Student union, Maple Leaf Charity, Slo Pitch, Ultimate Frisbee, Coffee Press Newspaper, Maples Form Magazine, Cycling Club, Cooking Club, Kung Fu, Yoga and many more.

Student services

Services for international students
Services provided for international students include such items as:
International Student Office
Extensive campus tour upon arrival
Tour of local area
Academic counselling
Personal counselling
Assistance with explaining procedures and resolving any issues
Student visa renewal and other legal requirements
Field trips
Social activities

Exchange program

　　Student exchanges with British Columbia (BC) Canada high schools are possible. This opportunity is unique as Canadian students may obtain an international experience in China and yet continue uninterrupted in their BC high-school program, taught by B.C. certified teachers and earn BC credits for their BC high school transcript and diploma.

Services regarding university/college applications
　　Graduates applying to study at universities or colleges in Canada receive study permits (student visas) through a streamlined process based on an agreement dealing with immigration issues signed by British Columbia and Citizenship and Immigration Canada.

Academic Counselling
　　The academic advisers at Dalian Maple Leaf International School are available to
help students with course selection and post-secondary planning. The advisers meet
individually with students to discuss their educational choices, assist in planning their
career pathways, and guide them through the application process for universities and
Colleges.

Student Residence
　　Full boarding options are available if required.

Annual University/College Recruitment Fair
　　Maple Leaf hosts Annual Maple Leaf International Schools University and College Recruitment Fair. Students and parents are welcomed to attend the event and talk to institution representatives in person in order to make their final post-secondary choices. Some institutions give offers to eligible students in the fair.

See also

 Dalian

References

External links
Maple Leaf Educational Systems and Schools
 Maple Leaf Education Group (in Chinese, English, Japanese and Korean)

Education in Dalian
High schools in Dalian
International schools in China